Vassbotna is a village in the southern part of the municipality of Høylandet in Trøndelag county, Norway. Drageid Church is located in this village, and it serves the people in the southern part of Høylandet municipality.

References

Villages in Trøndelag
Høylandet